Dover was a French vessel launched in 1807 under another name and taken in prize that year. She sailed between Britain and North America until 1814 when a United States privateer captured and burnt her.

Career
Dover first appeared in Lloyd's Register (LR) in 1807.

On 15 October 1812 Dover, Adey, master, had to put back into Liverpool leaky. She had been sailing from Liverpool to Newfoundland when she was driven onshore on the coast of Ireland. She had had to throw part of her cargo overboard.

Fate
On 24 June 1814 the U.S. privateer Rattlesnake captured "the Wasp, Dorey, of Guernsey; and the Dover, of London, laden with Grain, bound to Lisbon". Rattlesnake burnt both vessels.  captured Rattlesnake two days later.

References

1807 ships
Ships built in France
Captured ships
Age of Sail merchant ships of England
Maritime incidents in 1814